Fitzpatrick Hotel is a historic hotel in Washington, Georgia. It was built in 1898. It was added to the National Register of Historic Places in 1982. It is located at 16 West Public Square.

A great fire in Washington-Wilkes Georgia in 1895 destroyed the buildings on the site where the hotel was built. It was the first building in Washington to have electricity and a telephone system.

It is a three-story building with load-bearing brick construction that was deemed to be "a fine example of late nineteenth hotel design in a mid-sized Georgia town. Its Queen Anne style design and detailing are particularly outstanding for a hotel in a town of this size. In terms of commerce, the building is significant as an intact example of the hotels located in Georgia's county seats to serve local and county citizens with courthouse business, traveling salesmen (drummers) and out of town visitors."

It was designed by architects Golucke and Stewart.  Its Queen Anne exterior detailing includes its "rich mixture of building materials, textures and forms...brick, stone, metal, a corner turret, a balcony, bay windows, stained glass, garlands and swags [that] are combined here in a lively yet coherent manner."

See also
National Register of Historic Places listings in Wilkes County, Georgia

References

External links
The Fitzpatrick Hotel, official site

Buildings and structures in Wilkes County, Georgia
Hotels in Georgia (U.S. state)